Lostbone is a Polish death metal group formed in 2005.

History

Time To Rise (2005–2007) 
Lostbone was formed by Przemek Łucyan in October 2005. The first permanent drummer- Krzysiek Bałauszko – joined in January 2006. This team of two created ten tracks incorporated in the first album. For a few months Lostbone had a second guitarist- Biały, but after he quit, the band settled to incorporate only one guitarist. In September 2006 the first permanent vocalist, Piotrek Surmacz, joined the band, soon followed by the bassist, Adrian Manowski in January 2007. The band of four recorded the first EP- ‘Time to Rise’ in Progresja Studio in Warsaw by Paweł ‘Janos’ Grabowski during only two days (10–11.02.2007), mixing and mastering included. It was not only the first Lostbone record but also the debut of the Progresja Studio. The graphic design of the EP was created by Jakub Sokólski. The band performed live for the first time in CPK in Warsaw.

Lostbone (2007–2008) 
In July 2007 previous bassist was replaced by Maciek Krzemiński, former member of Harmider. One month later, once again in Progresja Studio, Lostbone recorded the first album incorporating 10 tracks. On 10 October 2007 Lostbone together with Hedfirst and Carnal performed on the ParkFest in Warsaw, where members met the current drummer- Janek Englisz. Only one month later Janek replaced Krzysiek Bałauszko. Two tracks from the ‘Time to Rise’ EP were released on the ‘DIY: Hardcore Attack 2007’ compilation in November. The Depozyt 44 club in Warsaw hosted the premiere of the first album named ‘Lostbone’ on 20 January 2008. On this day, the band shared the stage with Totem and Chain Reaction. The distribution in Poland was taken over by the Spook Records. The album earned a number of good reviews, tracks  began to be played late at night in several radio stations which was soon followed by numerous concerts. ‘Sick Of It’ was released by the French United Winds music label in April 2008 as part of the ‘Moshing Attitude part 1’ compilation. Maciek Krzemiński left the band in June 2008.

Split It Out (2008–2009) 
In July 2008 bassist Michał Kowalczyk joined Lostbone and one month later the vocalist was replaced by Bartosz ‘Barton’ Szarek. The long time band's lineup was formed. In Progresja Studio the band recorded three tracks in September 2008, incorporated one month later into the Split EP with Terrordome – ‘Split It Out’.  Kacper ‘Sober’ Rachtan was responsible for the graphic design of the split. On 12 October in Warsaw Club Punkt Lostbone performed for the first time in the new lineup. In December, the ‘Lostbone’ album had its worldwide premiere in the digital form thanks to the US publisher Defend Music. At the same time, Poland witnessed the release of ‘Blood Hardcore’ compilation incorporating two tracks from the ‘Split It Out’. The end of 2008 and the first half of 2009 were marked by numerous concerts played among others alongside L'Esprit du Clan, Beatallica, Frontside, Proletaryat, or Corruption. Premiere of the first music clip ‘Vultures’ took place in June 2009.

Severance (2009–2011) 
In the Summer 2009 in Progresja Studio, Lostbone together with Janos recorded twelve tracks for the second album – ‘Severance’. Szymon Czech from the Olsztyn X Studio and Elephant Studio was responsible for mixing and mastering. Once again, Kacper Rachtan prepared the graphic design of the album. Album with the characteristic hangman's knot on the cover had its premiere on 13 February 2010 by AltArt Music, and one day later, Lostbone performed the premiere concert in Warsaw Neo club alongside So I Scream. In March the group embarked on its first, full-scale tour alongside Corruption and Carnal as ‘Bourbon River Re-Creation Tour 2010’. The album received positive feedback from both the press and the audience, and the band continued with the concerts through the year, including the second part of tour with Corruption. ‘Severance’ was released in the digital form worldwide in June by Quickstar Production. Year 2011 started for Lostbone with playing as a support for KAT & Roman Kostrzewski in the Warsaw Stodoła club. The first video promoting ‘Severance’ for the title track premiered in April. Following months brought considerable number of concerts, among others a tour with Frontside, which resulted in winning the second place at the polish finale of Wacken Metal Battle 2011. Other important performances included becoming the only support of Cavalera conspiracy in Stodoła club or playing as one of the leading bands during the Metalowa Twierdza 2011 Festival. In July 2011 Lostbone entered the Sound Division Studio in Warsaw to record the third album. Arek ‘Malta’ Malczewski and Filip ‘Heinrich’ Hałucha were responsible for the recording. The end of the year was marked by even more concerts player either as a headliner or alongside Frontside and Hunter.

Ominous (2012–2013) 
Album ‘Ominous’ was released on 13 January 2012, and was this time followed by the three premiere concerts in Wrocław, Bielsko-Biała and Warsaw alongside among others Jelonek, Horrorscope and Ametria. The first video ‘An Eye for an Eye’ premiered on 8 January. The album met with a positive response and gathered good reviews, and numerous new tracks made appearance during concerts. In March, Lostbone together with Made Of Hate and Hedfirst embarked on the month-long ‘Metal Tour of 2012’ all over Poland. In the Summer months, Lostbone performed as a headliner during the ŻubrFest 2012, Festiwal Mocnych Brzmień alongside Decapitated and supported Six Feet Under during their Warsaw concert. The 1 September saw the premiere of the second video in a cartoon form – ‘Temptations’. The second half of the year was marked by the ‘Ominogen Live 2012’ mini- tour with Made Of Hate and concerts alongside Frontside, My Riot and Flapjack. The year has ended for the Lostbone with the performance at Warszawa Brzmi Ciężko festiwal alongside Hate and Hellectricity. In January 2013, the premiere of the third ‘Ominous’ video clip of the ‘Choose Or Be Chosen’ track took place. In February, Lostbone performed alongside Decapitated, None and Chainsaw during Black Star Fest IV – festival in the memory of Aleksander „Olass" Mendyk. At the same month, the band signed in the agreement with Fonografika, which was to release ‘Ominous’ worldwide in a digital form.  In March and April 2013, Lostbone embarked on yet another tour all over Poland alongside Made of Hate and numerous guests like Hedfirst, Huge CCM, TMS, Empatic, or Traces To Nowhere. The tour comprised fifteen concerts. In April, the band released the „Ominous" on YouTube for free. On 31 May, Lostbone performed during the Ursynalia 2013 Festival, alongside Motörhead, Bullet for my Valentine, Soilwork, Parkway Drive, and HIM. In June, Lostbone supported Coal Chamber in Mega Club in Katowice, and on 5 July Gojira in Stodoła club in Warsaw and during Metal Day in Nysa, followed by the series of Autumn concerts alongside Acid Drinkers, Hunter and Frontside, just to mention most important ones. Moreover, the band announced, that it is preparing for recording the new album, which is planned to take place during the first months of 2014.

Not Your Kind (2014–) 
Recording session of the fourth album started on 2 January 2014 in the ZED Studio. A some tracks were recorded in the HZ Studio, Selecta Studio and HUGE Studio. After the recording, Lostbone performed a number of concerts all over Poland, with bands like The Analogs, Drown My Day, Infliction, Deyacoda, Neshorn, as well as made the appearance during the Świebodzice Rockfest together with TSA, Luxtorpeda and Dżem on 15 March. In the beginning of April, Lostbone performed a short tour in Latvia. On 10 June, the band presented the cover of the new album and announced that the premiere will take place on 6 September. Album was titled ‘Not Your Kind’, and Łukasz ‘Pachu’ Pach known as a vocalist of Vedonist and Huge CCM and graphic designer of albums and T-shirts of bands such as Acid Drinkers, or Behemoth, was responsible for the design of the cover. August saw the release of the lyric video to ‘Through Hell We Rise’. The album was released worldwide by the Fonografika. Also this time, guest appearances on the album were Mike ‘Kosa’ Kostrzyński of Made of Hate, Dariusz ‘Daron’ Kupis of Frontside, that put on some kick ass guitar solos, as well as Łukasz ‘Pachu’ Pach, Tomasz ‘Titus’ Pukacki of Acid Drinkers and Tomasz ‘Lipa’ Lipnicki of Illusion and Lipali that laid down some vocals. The album incorporated the first Polish-language track – ‘Monolit’. On 29 August in Warsaw the ‘Drink & release party’ combined with the premiere of the video for the song ‘Nothing Left’ took place. Lostbone appeared in September at the Summer Dying Loud Festival in Aleksandrów, in the midst of bands such as Blindead, Riverside, Decapitated, Dezerter, Kabanos, Hunter, Corruption, None and Rust. In October, the band took a foreign tour including: Romania, Czech Republic and Hungary. The band Loko made the appearance with Lostbone during the entire tour. November 2014 brought another tour across Poland, this time in the company of Scarlet Skies. Lostbone finished the year 2014 by playing as a support for Pro-Pain in Zory. The first quarter of 2015 brought a series of concerts in Poland alongside, among others, Acid Drinkers, Empatic or Hope. In February the premiere of lyric video for the song "Monolit" took place. In April Lostbone once again visited Romania, and in May arrived together with Enhet in Latvia. In July, the band appeared at the Rock Night 2015 festival alongside Dezerter and Virgin Snatch, and performed at two festivals in Romania and the Czech Republic: Barock Fest and Barrocko Fest 2015. In the meantime, the premiere of another music video for the album ‘Not your Kind’ – a song ‘Into The Pit’ took place. In August Lostbone played on Muszla Fest in Bydgoszcz.

Metal United (2015–…)
In October 2015 Lostbone played the headliner tour across Romania. To celebrate the tenth anniversary, in October the band released a CD compilation ‘Metal United 2015’ with three new songs and other tracks submitted by four metal bands from Romania: Implant Pentru Refuz, Marchosias, Target and Decease. New songs were recorded in August in ex-Progresja Studio – renamed the JNS Studio – once again under the guidance of Paweł ‘Janos’ Grabowski. The end of 2015 year brought yet another shows across Poland.

Members 
 Current members  
 Przemysław Łucyan – guitar (2005–present)
 Michał Kowalczyk – bass guitar (2008–present)
 Jan Englisz – drums (2007–present)

 Former members 
 Bartosz "Barton" Szarek – vocals (2008–2015)
 Krzysztof Bałauszko – drums (2006–2007)
 "Biały" – second guitar (2006)
 Piotr Surmacz – vocals (2006–2008)
 Adrian Manowski – bass guitar (2007)
 Maciek Krzemiński – bass guitar (2007–2008)

Discography 
 Time to rise (2007, EP)
 Split it out (with z Terrordome, 2008)
 Lostbone (2008)
 Severance (2010)
 Ominous (2012) 
 Not Your Kind (2014)
 Metal United (2015, compilation, CD)
 Charts

Video clips
 „Choose Or Be Chosen" – 2013 (Tomek Niedzielko and Magogo Production)
 „Temptations" – 2012 (Mikołaj Birek)
 „An Eye for an Eye" – 2012 (Tomek Niedzielko and Magogo Production)
 „Severance" – 2011 (Piotr Karcz and Karczoid)
 „Vultures" – 2009 (Misiek Ślusarski)
 „Nothing Left" – 2014 (Dominik L. Marzec, Michał Barylski)
 „Into the pit" – 2015 (Tomek Niedzielko, dancers: Marta Ranosz i Dela Potera)

References

External links
 Official website

Polish death metal musical groups
Polish thrash metal musical groups
Polish heavy metal musical groups